Eordaikos 2007 (Εορδαϊκός 2007) (former Ptolemaida-Lignitorikhi) is a football club based in Ptolemaida, Greece.

History
The club named Eordaikos 2007 is following the history of  Eordaikos which is one of the better known football clubs in Western Macedonia. Eordaikos was created in 1978 from the merge of two Ptolemaida teams, the team of Aris Ptolemaidas with former presence in the second division and Ptolemaios, playing in the second and third division of the Greek tier and having successful runs in the Greek cup.

In 1996, the club due to serious financial problems merged with Iraklis Ptolemaidas and renamed to PAS Ptolemaidas. PAS Ptolemaida merged then with Anagenisi Ptolemaidas to form A.S. Ptolemaida . In 2004 the Club changes its and name for another time to PAE Ptolemaida-Lignitorikhi. Finally, in 2007, the administrative council decided to rename the Club to T.A.P. Eordaikos 2007.

Colours and Crest 

The team colours are green and yellow, something unique in Greece. 
Eordaikos' success opened a new chapter in the football history of the prefecture Kozani.

Stadium
National Stadium of Ptolemaida - Emilios Theofanidis (In honour of Emilios Theofanidis, footballer of AEK Athens and PAOK in the late-1960s and early-1970s)

Past Highlights
Appearances in the second division: 1978-83, 1989–91, 1992-1993
Appearances in the third division: 1983-1989, 1991–92, 1993–95, 2007-today.
 2008-2009 Gamma Ethniki

External links
 https://web.archive.org/web/20100930144824/http://www.eordaikosfans.gr/  - [The official website for Eordaikos Fans].

Football clubs in Western Macedonia
Association football clubs established in 2007
2007 establishments in Greece
Gamma Ethniki clubs